This page includes the discography of Cypriot pop singer Anna Vissi.

From 1995 to 2015, Vissi received 38 platinum certifications in Greece and has become one of the country's best-selling female artist. Her album Kravgi still remains the best-selling albums of the 2000s (decade), and one of the best-selling of all time, while two others Travma and Antidoto are among the best-selling. She also had some success in the United States, reaching number one on the U.S. Billboard Hot Dance Club Play Chart with "Call Me". Anna Vissi is the best-selling Greek album artist, with her albums exceeding 10 million sales.

Albums

Studio albums
* denotes unknown or unavailable information.

Live albums
* denotes unknown or unavailable information.

Soundtracks
* denotes unknown or unavailable information.

Singles
In Greece and Cyprus, singles are usually released only as radio singles rather than physical releases. CD Maxi or EPs are not often released, and usually include either up to seven new songs, or remixes of various songs (up to seven different songs to be eligible for the single charts).

CD Maxi / EPs / Singles (CD or digital)
Cyprus official CD-single charts (which included EPs and CD-maxi's) were available from 1992 until end of 2006. Digital singles charts are available since 2010.
Greek official CD-single charts (which included EPs and CD-maxi's) were available until February 2007. Digital singles charts are available since 2008.

Full singles discography
Radio singles released in Cyprus and Greece

1974 – 1980

1980 – 1990

1990 – 1999

2000 – 2009

2010 – 2019

2020 – 2022

As a featured artist

DVDs
* denotes unknown or unavailable information.
{| class="wikitable" style="text-align:center;"
|-
!rowspan="2"| Year
!rowspan="2" style="width:300px;"| Album details
!colspan="3"| Peak chart positions
!rowspan="2"| Certifications(sales thresholds)
|- 
!style="width:3em;font-size:85%"|GRE

!style="width:3em;font-size:85%"|CYP

!style="width:3em;font-size:85%"|AUS
|-
|2001
|align="left"| The Video Collection
Released: 2001
Label: Sony Music Greece/Columbia
Formats: DVD
| 1
| —
| 2
|
|-
|2005
|align="left"| Live
Released: 2005
Label: Sony Music Greece/Columbia
Formats: DVD
| 1
| 1
| —
|align="left"| 
GRE: Platinum
|-
|2013
|align="left"| Daimones 2013
Released: November, 2013
Label: ELTHEA
Formats: DVD
| *
| *
| —
|
|-
| colspan="8" style="text-align:center; font-size:85%"|"—" denotes releases that did not chart or was not released
|}

Official compilations
* denotes unknown or unavailable information.

Collaborations
 1974: 18 Lianotragouda Tis Pikris Patridas (various)
 1974: Welcome to Greece No 5 14 big hits syrtaki dances (various)
 1974: Mikres Politeies (various)
 1974: Mia Hara, Mia Kaimos (various)
 1974: Xilia Enniakosia Tipota (various)
 1975: Mia Xara, Mia Kaimos (various)
 1975: Stavros Kougioumtzis' Sta Psila Ta Parathiria
 1975: Zitima Chronou (various)
 1975: Grammata Apo Ti Germania (various)
 1976: Imnos Kai Thrinos Gia Tin Kipro/Eksi Tragoudia (various)
 1980: To Tzitziki Kai I Parea Tou
 1985: Nikos Karvelas' Nick Carr
 1985: Gia ta Paidia (various)
 1990: Nikos Karvelas Diavolaki
 1991: Nikos Karvelas O Teleftaios Choros
 1993: Sofia Karvela Kolla to!
 1995: Nikos Karvelas 25 ores
 1996: Nikos Karvelas To aroma tis Amartias
 1998: Nikos Karvelas Ena Xrono to Perissotero
 2000: Nikos Karvelas Ola Einai Entaxei
 2003: Nikos Karvelas Party Gia Spasmenes Kardies
 2003: Konstantinos Christoforou I Agapi Sou Paei

International releases
 1982: "Love Is a Lonely Weekend" (Single)
 1997: "Forgive Me This" (Promo)
 1997: "Forgive Me This" (Single)
 1997: Travma (Australian Release)
 1999: Anna Vissi (International Release)
 2000: Re (Turkish Release)
 2001: "Everything I Am" (CD & Single, Dutch release)
 2001: Kravgi (Turkish Release) - Gold
 2002: Kravgi (Australian Release)
 2002: X (Turkish Release)
 2004: Paraksenes Ikones (Turkish Release)
 2005: Live (Turkish Release)
 2005: Strange Pictures (Bulgarian Release of Paraksenes Ikones)
 2005: "Call Me" (Single, USA Digital Download)
 2006: Nylon (Turkish Release)
 2006: "Everything" (Single, Swedish and Finnish Release)
 2006: Nylon Euro-Edition (German, Austrian, Swiss, Taiwanese Release)
 2007: The Essential Anna Vissi

Videography

References

External links
Anna Vissi's official website
IFPI Greece official website with Greek charts

Discographies of Greek artists
Discography
Pop music discographies
Discographies of Cypriot artists